Ivan Aleksandrovich Lapshov (born 1 May 1999) is a Russian football player. He plays for FC Orenburg-2.

Club career
He made his debut in the Russian Professional Football League for FC Kazanka Moscow on 30 March 2018 in a game against FC Chertanovo Moscow.

He made his Russian Premier League debut for FC Lokomotiv Moscow on 10 May 2019 in a game against FC Rubin Kazan.

On 2 September 2019, he signed with FC Orenburg. On 1 October 2020, he was loaned to FC Tom Tomsk.

References

External links
 
 
 

1999 births
Footballers from Moscow
Living people
Russian footballers
Association football defenders
Russia youth international footballers
Russia under-21 international footballers
FC Lokomotiv Moscow players
FC Orenburg players
FC Tom Tomsk players
FC Yenisey Krasnoyarsk players
Russian Premier League players
Russian First League players
Russian Second League players